Artur Wojdat (born 20 May 1968 in Olsztyn) is a former international swimmer from Poland, who won the bronze medal in the men's 400 metres freestyle at the 1988 Summer Olympics in Seoul, South Korea. He also competed at the 1992 Summer Olympics in Barcelona, Spain. He came to the 1988 Seoul Olympics as a world record holder in the 400 m freestyle event. In the final of the Olympics he beat his world record time but managed to only finish third behind Uwe Dassler and Duncan Armstrong.

See also
World record progression 400 metres freestyle

References
 

1968 births
Living people
Polish male freestyle swimmers
Olympic swimmers of Poland
Swimmers at the 1988 Summer Olympics
Swimmers at the 1992 Summer Olympics
Olympic bronze medalists for Poland
Sportspeople from Olsztyn
World record setters in swimming
Olympic bronze medalists in swimming
World Aquatics Championships medalists in swimming
Medalists at the FINA World Swimming Championships (25 m)
European Aquatics Championships medalists in swimming
Iowa Hawkeyes men's swimmers
University of Iowa alumni
Medalists at the 1988 Summer Olympics
Universiade medalists in swimming
Universiade gold medalists for Poland
Universiade silver medalists for Poland
Medalists at the 1991 Summer Universiade
20th-century Polish people